Emil Schovánek (10 September 1885 – 11 July 1947) was a Czech painter.

Life 
Emil Schovánek was born in Prague (then part of Austria-Hungary) on 10 September 1885. He studied at the Prague Academy of Fine Arts from 1903 to 1909. He undertook a study trip from 1911 to 1913 in Yugoslavia, Italy and France. He died in Prague on 11 July 1947, aged 61.

Gallery

References

Sources 
 Beyer, Andreas; Savoy, Bénédicte; Tegethoff, Wolf, eds. (2021). "Schovánek, Emil". In Allgemeines Künstlerlexikon - Internationale Künstlerdatenbank - Online. K. G. Saur. Retrieved 8 October 2022.

External links 

 "Kniha narozenych" (birth). p. 183. (LBŇ N9 • 1884-1886). Archivní Katalog. Retrieved 8 October 2022.
 "Kniha oddaných" (marriage). p. 17. (LBŇ O10 • 1912-1918). Archivní Katalog. Retrieved 8 October 2022.
 "Kniha narozených" (issue). p. 297. (LBŇ N21 • 1910-1913). Archivní Katalog. Retrieved 8 October 2022.
 "Naše trio" (family portrait). (Regionální muzeum a galerie Jičín). eSbirky.cz. Retrieved 8 October 2022.

1885 births
1947 deaths
Artists from Prague
20th-century Czech painters